The Coyote Creek Bridge near Crow, Oregon, United States, is listed on the National Register of Historic Places. The  Howe truss structure, built in 1922, carries Battle Creek Road over Coyote Creek. The bridge is a site for hikes and other outdoor events during spring and summer.

See also
 List of bridges on the National Register of Historic Places in Oregon
 National Register of Historic Places listings in Lane County, Oregon

References

External links
 

1922 establishments in Oregon
Bridges completed in 1922
Covered bridges on the National Register of Historic Places in Oregon
Covered bridges in Lane County, Oregon
National Register of Historic Places in Eugene, Oregon
Road bridges on the National Register of Historic Places in Oregon
Wooden bridges in Oregon
Howe truss bridges in the United States